The Regiment "Piemonte Cavalleria" (2nd) is a cavalry regiment of the Italian Army based in Villa Opicina in Friuli Venezia Giulia.The regiment is the reconnaissance unit of the Alpine Brigade "Julia".

History

Formation 
In 1690 the Duke of Savoy Victor Amadeus II joined the Nine Years' War against the Kingdom of France. On 23 July 1692 the Cavalry Regiment "Piemonte Reale" and the Cavalry Regiment "Savoia" were formed for service in the war. The Piemonte was named for the Principality of Piedmont and consisted of nine companies, formed from the existing Gens d'Arme companies. The regiment fought in 1693 in the Battle of Marsaglia.

After the war the Cavalry Regiment "Savoia" was disbanded on 22 November 1699 and its men and horses transferred to the Cavalry Regiment "Piemonte Reale" and the Regiment Dragoons of His Royal Highness.

Cabinet Wars 
In 1701 Duke Victor Amadeus II joined the War of the Spanish Succession and the regiment fought in 1702 in the Battle of Luzzara, in 1706 in the Siege of Turin, in 1707 in the Siege of Toulon, and at Villanovetta. On 27 March 1713 the regiment was reduced to eight companies, which were grouped into four squadrons. The same year the war ended with the Peace of Utrecht.

In 1733 King Charles Emmanuel III joined the War of the Polish Succession on the French-Spanish. In December 1733 the Piemonte Reale was increased to ten companies for the war. The regiment fought in 1734 in the Battle of San Pietro and the Battle of Guastalla against Austrian forces.

In 1742 King Charles Emmanuel III joined the War of the Austrian Succession on the Austrian side and the Piemonte Reale fought in 1744 in the Battle of Madonna dell'Olmo and in 1746 in the Siege of Valenza.

On 16 September 1774 the Piemonte Reale ceded two of its companies to help form the Cavalry Regiment "Aosta" and from then on consisted of eight companies grouped in four squadrons.

French Revolutionary Wars 
In 1792 King Victor Amadeus III joined the War of the First Coalition against the French Republic. From 1792 to 1796 the Savoia fought against the French Army of Italy. In March 1796 Napoleon Bonaparte arrived in Italy and took command of the French forces, with which he defeated the Royal Sardinian Army in the Montenotte campaign within a month. On 28 April 1796, King Victor Amadeus III had to sign the Armistice of Cherasco and on 15 May 1796 the Treaty of Paris, which forced Sardinia out of the First Coalition. Victor Amadeus III also had to cede the Duchy of Savoy and the County of Nice to France. On 16 October 1796 Victor Amadeus III died and his eldest son Charles Emmanuel IV ascended the throne. On 26 October 1796 King Charles Emmanuel IV ordered to reduce the Kingdom's cavalry forces and the Piemonte Reale was reduced to four squadrons. On the same date the company level was abolished.

In fall 1798 France invaded the remaining territories of King Charles Emmanuel IV. On 6 December 1798 French forces occupied Turin and on 8 December 1798 Charles Emmanuel IV was forced to sign a document of abdication, which also ordered his former subjects to recognise French laws and his troops to obey the orders of the French Army. Charles Emmanuel IV went into exile on Sardinia, while his former territories became the Piedmontese Republic. On 9 December 1798 the Sardinian troops were released from their oath of allegiance to the King and sworn to the Piedmontese Republic. The same month the Cavalry Regiment "Piemonte Reale" was renamed 4th Cavalry Regiment.

In January 1799 the regiment was renamed 4th Piedmontese Dragoons Regiment. The same month the 6th Cavalry Regiment, the former Cavalry Regiment "Savoia", was disbanded, and two of its squadrons were transferred to the 4th Piedmontese Dragoons Regiment. In spring 1799 the regiment fought for the French in the War of the Second Coalition against the Austrians. On 5 April 1799 the regiment fought in the Battle of Magnano, which the Austrians won, forcing the French out of Italy. With the French retreat the Piedmontese Republic dissolved and the 4th Piedmontese Dragoons Regiment, like all regiments of the Piedmontese Republic, was disbanded in May 1799.

Restauration 
On 11 April 1814 Napoleon abdicated and on 20 May 1814 King Victor Emmanuel I returned from exile in Sardinia to Turin. On 24 May 1814 Victor Emmanuel I ordered to reform the cavalry regiments disbanded in 1799 and in July 1814 the King decreed to begin the formation of the Regiment "Piemonte Reale Cavalleria". On 1 January 1815 the regiment consisted of six squadrons grouped into three divisions.

On 31 July 1827 the regiment formed two new squadrons, which were grouped into a newly formed division. On 24 December 1828 the Piemonte Reale provided some of its personnel to help form the new Regiment "Dragoni di Piemonte". On 29 August 1831 the regiment was reduced to six squadrons and a depot squadron, which would have been formed in times of war.

Italian Wars of Independence 
In 1848-49 the regiment participated in the First Italian War of Independence, fighting in 1848 in the battles of Pastrengo, Santa Lucia, Colmasina
Sommacampagna, Godesco, and Milan, and in 1849 in the battles of Sforzesca and Novara. For its conduct at Sforzesca and Novara the regiment was awarded a Silver Medal of Military Valour.

On 3 January 1850 the regiment was reduced to four squadrons, with the regiment's 6th Squadron used to form the depot of the newly formed Regiment "Cavalleggeri di Alessandria". In 1855 the regiment provided 32 volunteers for the Sardinian expeditionary corps' Provisional Light Cavalry Regiment, which fought in the Crimean War and distinguished itself on 16 August 1855 in the Battle of the Chernaya.

In 1859 the regiment participated in the Second Italian War of Independence and fought at Sesia and Vinzaglio. On 16 September 1859 the Piemonte Reale ceded one of its squadrons to help form the Regiment "Cavalleggeri di Milano" and on 19 October of the same year the regiment was redesignated as Cuirassiers unit and renamed Regiment "Corazzieri di Piemonte". Already on 6 June 1860 the regiment resumed to use its previous name Regiment "Piemonte Reale Cavalleria".

In the 1860-1861 the regiment participated in the campaign in central and southern Italy and fought in the battle of Perugia and the Siege of Ancona. For its conduct during the Battle of Garigliano the regiment was awarded its second Silver Medal of Military Valour. In 1866 the regiment participated in the Third Italian War of Independence and fought in the Battle of Custoza.

On 5 June 1869 regiment was awarded a Bronze Medal of Military Valour for having restored public order in Budrio after the introduction of a milling tax caused a popular revolt in the Emilia region. Over the next years the regiment repeatedly changed its name:

 10 September 1871: 2nd Regiment of Cavalry (Piemonte Reale)
 5 November 1876: Cavalry Regiment "Piemonte Reale" (2nd)
 16 December 1897: Regiment "Piemonte Reale Cavalleria" (2nd)

In 1887 the regiment contributed to the formation of the Mounted Hunters Squadron, which fought in the Italo-Ethiopian War of 1887–1889. In 1895-96 the regiment provided 68 enlisted personnel for units deployed to Italian Eritrea for the First Italo-Ethiopian War. On 1 October 1909 the Piemonte Reale ceded one of its squadrons to help form new Regiment "Lancieri di Mantova" (25th). In 1911-12 the regiment provided six officers and 66 enlisted to augment units fighting in the Italo-Turkish War.

World War I 
At the outbreak of World War I the regiment consisted of a command, the regimental depot, and two cavalry groups, with the I Group consisting of three squadrons and the II Group consisting of two squadrons and a machine gun section. The regiment fought dismounted in the trenches of the Italian Front. In 1916 the regiment ceded its 1st Squadron temporarily to the Regiment "Genova Cavalleria" (4th). The same year the regiment fought in the Battle of Gorizia. In 1917 the regimental depot in Rome formed the 1496th Dismounted Machine Gunners Company as reinforcement for infantry units on the front. In 1918 the regiment fought in the Battle of Vittorio Veneto.

Interwar years 
After the war the Italian Army disbanded 14 of its 30 cavalry regiments, which did not affect the Piemonte Reale Cavalleria. However on 20 May 1920 a further five cavalry regiments were disbanded and the Piemonte Reale received and integrated a squadron from the Regiment "Lancieri di Firenze" (9th).

In 1933 the regiment moved from Rome to Udine. In 1935-36 the regiment contributed the following personnel for the Second Italo-Ethiopian War:

 two officers and 255 enlisted for the formation of the I and II truck-transported machine gunners groups of the Regiment "Genova Cavalleria" (4th)
 ten officers and 106 enlisted for the formation of the IV Fast Tanks Group "Duca degli Abruzzi" of the Regiment "Cavalleggeri Guide" (19th) 
 ten officers and 150 enlisted for other units

In 1939 the regiment moved from Udine to Meran.

World War II 
At the outbreak of World War II the regiment consisted of a command, a command squadron, the I and II squadrons groups, each with two mounted squadrons, and the 5th Machine Gunners Squadron. In April 1941 the regiment participated in the invasion of Yugoslavia. Afterwards the regiment served in Croatia on anti-partisan duty. In June 1942 the regiment returned to Italy.  In November 1942 the regiment participated in the occupation of Vichy France, after which the regiment remained in France until August 1943 on occupation duty. During the war the regiment's depot in Meran formed the LII Dismounted Group "Piemonte Reale Cavalleria". After the announcement of the Armistice of Cassibile on 8 September 1943 invading German forces disbanded the regiment in Meran.

Cold War 
On 16 November 1946 the 2nd Cavalieri Reconnaissance Group was formed in Meran and assigned to the IV Army Corps. In 1947 the group moved from Meran to Florence, where it joined the Infantry Division "Friuli". In December 1948 the group was renamed Armored Cavalry Group "Piemonte Cavalleria" and on 15 May 1949 the group was expanded to 2nd Armored Cavalry Regiment "Piemonte Cavalleria". The regiment consisted of a command, a command squadron, and two squadrons groups. In May 1951 the regiment formed a third squadrons group. In 1956 the regiment moved from Florence to Trieste. On 1 April 1957 the regiment was assigned to the Cavalry Brigade in Gradisca d'Isonzo and on 4 November 1958 the regiment was renamed Regiment "Piemonte Cavalleria" (2nd). In 1966 the regiment moved from Trieste to Villa Opicina.

During the 1975 army reform the army disbanded the regimental level and newly independent battalions were granted for the first time their own flags. On 1 October 1975 the Regiment "Piemonte Cavalleria" (2nd) and its III Squadrons Group in Trieste were disbanded. The regiment's I Squadrons Group was reorganized and renamed 2nd Mechanized Squadrons Group "Piemonte Cavalleria" and assigned the flag and traditions of the regiment. The squadrons group consisted of a command, a command and services squadron, three mechanized squadrons with M113 armored personnel carriers, and a heavy mortar squadron with M106 mortar carriers with 120mm mod. 63 mortars. The regiment's II Squadrons Group in Sgonico was renamed 9th Tank Squadrons Group "Lancieri di Firenze" and assigned the flag and traditions of the Regiment "Lancieri di Firenze" (9th). Both squadrons groups were part of the Armored Brigade "Vittorio Veneto".

For its conduct and work after the 1976 Friuli earthquake the squadrons group was awarded a Bronze Medal of Army Valour, which was affixed to the battalion's flag and added to the battalion's coat of arms.

Recent times 
After the end of the Cold War the Italian Army began to draw down its forces and the Vittorio Veneto was one of the first brigades to disband. On 31 July 1991 the brigade was deactivated along with most of its subordinate units, while the 2nd Mechanized Squadrons Group "Piemonte Cavalleria" was transferred to the Cavalry Brigade "Pozzuolo del Friuli". On the same date the 2nd Mechanized Squadrons Group "Piemonte Cavalleria" lost its autonomy and the next day the squadrons group entered the newly formed 2nd Regiment "Piemonte Cavalleria". On 1 August 1992 the regiment was renamed Regiment "Piemonte Cavalleria" (2nd) and consisted now of a command, a command and services squadron, and a squadrons group with three armored squadrons equipped with wheeled Centauro tank destroyers.

On 1 October 2014 the regiment was transferred from the Cavalry Brigade "Pozzuolo del Friuli" to the Alpine Brigade "Julia".

Current structure 

As of 2022 the Regiment "Piemonte Cavalleria" (2nd) consists of:

  Regimental Command, in Villa Opicina
 Command and Logistic Support Squadron
 1st Reconnaissance Squadrons Group
 1st Reconnaissance Squadron
 2nd Reconnaissance Squadron
 3rd Reconnaissance Squadron
 Heavy Armored Squadron

The Command and Logistic Support Squadron fields the following platoons: C3 Platoon, Transport and Materiel Platoon, Medical Platoon, and Commissariat Platoon. The three reconnaissance squadrons are equipped with VTLM Lince vehicles and Centauro tank destroyers, the latter of which are scheduled to be replaced by Freccia reconnaissance vehicles. The Heavy Armor Squadron is equipped with Centauro tank destroyers, which are being replaced by Centauro II tank destroyers.

See also 
 Alpine Brigade "Julia"

External links
 Italian Army Website: Reggimento "Piemonte Cavalleria" (2°)

References

Cavalry Regiments of Italy